The Ambrose Rocks are a small cluster of rocks situated southwest of the southern Argentine Islands and  northwest of the Gaunt Rocks, off the west coast of Graham Land, Antarctica. They were named by the UK Antarctic Place-Names Committee for David A. Ambrose, a survey assistant of the Hydrographic Survey Unit from HMS Endurance working in this area in February 1969.

References 

Rock formations of the Wilhelm Archipelago